"Everything I Need" is a song by the Australian group Men at Work. The song was written by Men at Work singer/guitarist Colin Hay and the recording was produced by Hay with keyboardist Greg Ham. It was released in May 1985 as the lead single from their album Two Hearts.

The tune is a mid-tempo pop/rock song, and is marked by a loud, thwacking drum rhythm and a prominent slide guitar solo.

"Everything I Need" peaked at #47 on the Billboard Hot 100 and #37 on the Australian chart. It was the last Men at Work single to make the charts.

Reception
Cash Box magazine said "Australia's first big American breaker has fallen from the public eye due to a lack of recent product, but this latest single from the band's upcoming LP recaptures the quirky melodic charm that made the band such a multi-format winner the first time around."

Track listing

7": Epic / A 6276 - UK 
 "Everything I Need" (Single version) – 3:35
 "Sail to You" – 3:25

12": Epic / TA 6276 - UK
 "Everything I Need" (Extended version) – 4:35
 "Sail to You" – 3:25

12": Columbia / 44 05216 - U.S.
 "Everything I Need" (Extended Version) – 4:35
 "Everything I Need" (Single Version) – 3:35

Charts

References

1985 songs
1985 singles
Men at Work songs
Songs written by Colin Hay
Epic Records singles